The Dolomites (Ladin: Dolomites;  ;), also known as the Dolomite Mountains, Dolomite Alps or Dolomitic Alps, are a mountain range in northeastern Italy. They form part of the Southern Limestone Alps and extend from the River Adige in the west to the Piave Valley (Pieve di Cadore) in the east. The northern and southern borders are defined by the Puster Valley and the Sugana Valley (Italian: Valsugana). The Dolomites are in the regions of Veneto, Trentino-Alto Adige/Südtirol and Friuli Venezia Giulia, covering an area shared between the provinces of Belluno, Vicenza, Verona, Trentino, South Tyrol, Udine and Pordenone.

Other mountain groups of similar geological structure are spread along the River Piave to the east – Dolomiti d'Oltrepiave; and far away over the Adige River to the west – Dolomiti di Brenta (Western Dolomites). A smaller group is called Piccole Dolomiti (Little Dolomites), between the provinces of Trentino, Verona, and Vicenza.

The Dolomiti Bellunesi National Park and many other regional parks are in the Dolomites. In August 2009, the Dolomites were declared a UNESCO World Heritage Site.The Adamello-Brenta UNESCO Global Geopark is also in the Dolomites.

Etymology 
The Dolomites, also known as the "Pale Mountains", take their name from the carbonate rock dolomite. This was named after the 18th-century French mineralogist Déodat Gratet de Dolomieu (1750–1801), who was the first to describe the mineral.

History 

For millennia, hunters and gatherers had advanced into the highest rocky regions and had probably also climbed some peaks. There is evidence that the Jesuit priest Franz von Wulfen from Klagenfurt climbed the Lungkofel and the Dürrenstein in the 1790s. In 1857 the Briton John Ball was the first to climb Monte Pelmo. Paul Grohmann later climbed numerous peaks such as the Antelao, Marmolata, Tofana, Monte Cristallo, and the Boè. Around 1860 the Agordin mountaineer Simone de Silvestro was the first person to consciously stand on the Civetta. Michael Innerkofler was one of the climbers of the Tre Cime di Lavaredo. Later very important local mountaineers, known for many first ascents, were Angelo Dibona and Giovanni Piaz.

During the First World War, the front line between the Italian and Austro-Hungarian army ran through the Dolomites, where both sides used mines extensively. Open-air war museums are at Cinque Torri (Five Towers), Monte Piana and Mount Lagazuoi. Many people visit the Dolomites to climb the vie ferrate, protected paths through the rock walls that were created during the war.

A number of long-distance footpaths traverse the Dolomites. They are called alte vie (German: Dolomiten Höhenwege – high paths), and are numbered 1 to 10. The trails take about a week to walk, and are served by numerous rifugi (huts). The first and the most renowned is the Alta Via 1. Radiocarbon dating has been used in the Alta Badia region to demonstrate a connection between landslide activity and climate change.

Geography 
The region is commonly divided into the Western and Eastern Dolomites, separated by a line following the Val Badia – Campolongo Pass – Cordevole Valley (Agordino) axis.

Current classification 
The Dolomites may be divided into the following ranges:

 Sella
 Marmolada
 Tofane
 Langkofel Group
 Geisler Group
 Peitlerkofel Group
 Puez Group
 Fanes Group
 Schlern Group
 Rosengarten
 Latemar
 Pala
 Lüsen Mountains
 Civetta
 Pelmo
 Marmarole
 Cadini Group
 Cristallo Group
 Sorapiss
 Antelao
 Bosconero
 Vette Feltrine
 Schiara
 Prague Dolomites
 Sexten Dolomites
 Friulian Dolomites

Tourism and sports 

The Dolomites are renowned for skiing in the winter months and mountain climbing, hiking, cycling, and BASE jumping, as well as paragliding and hang gliding in summer and late spring/early autumn. Free climbing has been a tradition in the Dolomites since 1887, when 17-year-old Georg Winkler soloed the first ascent of the pinnacle of the Vajolettürme. The main centres include: Rocca Pietore alongside the Marmolada Glacier, which lies on the border of Trentino and Veneto, the small towns of Alleghe, Falcade, Auronzo, Cortina d'Ampezzo and the villages of Arabba, Urtijëi and San Martino di Castrozza, as well as the whole of the Fassa, Gardena and Badia valleys.

The Maratona dles Dolomites, an annual single-day road bicycle race covering seven mountain passes of the Dolomites, occurs in the first week of July.

Other characteristic places are:
 Mount Pasubio and Strada delle 52 Gallerie (a military mule road built during World War I with 52 tunnels)
 Altopiano di Asiago and Calà del Sasso, with 4444 steps, the world's longest staircase open to the public.

Major peaks

Major passes

Major parks 

 Dolomiti Bellunesi National Park 
 Parco naturale regionale delle Dolomiti d'Ampezzo 
 Naturpark Fanes-Sennes-Prags 

 Parco naturale Paneveggio – Pale di San Martino 
 Naturpark Schlern-Rosengarten 
 Naturpark Sextener Dolomiten 

 Naturpark Puez-Geisler 
 Parco naturale provinciale dell' Adamello-Brenta 
 Parco naturale regionale delle Dolomiti Friulane

See also 
 Alta Via 1
 Belluno
 Brenta Group
 Dolomiti Bellunesi National Park
 Golden age of alpinism
 Italian front (World War I)
 Silver age of alpinism
 Strada delle 52 Gallerie
 Via Ferrata
 White Friday (1916)
 White War

References

Bibliography
 
 Provincia di Belluno, Provincia Autonoma di Bolzano-Alto Adige Autonome Provinz Bozen-Südtirol, Provincia di Pordenone, Provincia Autonoma di Trento, Provincia di Udine, Regione Autonoma Friuli Venezia Giulia, 2008. Nomination of the Dolomites for inscription on the World Natural Heritage List UNESCO. Nomination Document. 363 pp. https://web.archive.org/web/20131225070444/http://fondazionedolomitiunesco.org/documentazione-2/01_DOLOMITES_nomination_document_jan2008_1236608233_1294933181.pdf

External links 

 Franco Grisa Timelapse
 North of Italy in 4K - Bashir Abu Shakra
 Dolomites on Hike.uno
 Italian official cartography (Istituto Geografico Militare - IGM); on-line version: www.pcn.minambiente.it
 Report on the via ferrata Bocchette di Brenta
 Information of the Dolomites

 
Mountain ranges of the Alps
Mountain ranges of Italy
Mountain ranges of South Tyrol
Southern Limestone Alps
World Heritage Sites in Italy